Delone Bausch (born 1935) is an American former politician in the state of Washington. He served in the Washington House of Representatives and Washington State Senate as a Democrat from 1973 to 1981.

References

Living people
1935 births
People from Olympia, Washington
Democratic Party Washington (state) state senators
Democratic Party members of the Washington House of Representatives